Magnussen is a surname. Notable people with the surname include:

Arne Magnussen (1884–1970), Norwegian trade unionist, newspaper editor and politician for the Labour and the Social Democratic Labour parties
Billy Magnussen (born 1985), American actor
Bjørn Magnussen (born 1998), Norwegian speed skater
Davur Juul Magnussen, Faroese trombonist
Einar Magnussen (1931–2004), Norwegian economist and politician
Fritz Magnussen (1878–1920), Danish film director and screenwriter
Harro Magnussen (1861–1908), German sculptor
James Magnussen (born 1991), Australian swimmer
Jan Magnussen (born 1973), Danish racing driver
Jon Magnussen (born 1959), Norwegian academic
Karen Magnussen, OC (born 1952), Canadian figure skater
Karin Magnussen (1908–1997), researcher at the Kaiser Wilhelm Institute of Anthropology, Human Heredity, and Eugenics during Germany's Third Reich
Kevin Magnussen (born 1992), Danish racing driver
Ryan Magnussen, American businessperson and media entrepreneur
Trond Magnussen (born 1973), Norwegian ice hockey player
Ulf Magnussen (born 1946), Norwegian handball player

Fictional characters
Charles Augustus Magnussen, a character in the television series Sherlock

See also
Murder of Martine Vik Magnussen involves the rape and murder of a 23-year-old Norwegian female business student, Martine Vik Magnussen
Magnusson (disambiguation)

Patronymic surnames
Surnames of Scandinavian origin